The 1967 Kerry Senior Football Championship was the 67th staging of the Kerry Senior Football Championship since its establishment by the Kerry County Board in 1889.

John Mitchels entered the championship as the defending champions, however, they were beaten by Mid Kerry in the quarter-finals.

The final was played on 5 November 1967 at Austin Stack Park in Tralee, between Mid Kerry and West Kerry, in what was their first ever meeting in the final. Mid Kerry won the match by 0-12 to 2-04 to claim their first ever championship title.

Results

Semi-finals

Final

Championship statistics

Miscellaneous
 Mid Kerry win the title for the first time.
 West Kerry qualify for the final for the first time since 1960.

References

Kerry Senior Football Championship
1967 in Gaelic football